Abrekia is an extinct genus of brachiopods found in Early Triassic strata in Russia and China. It was a stationary epifaunal suspension feeder.

References 

Rhynchonellida
Prehistoric brachiopod genera
Fossils of China
Fossils of Russia